Paratrachelizus is a genus of primitive weevils in the beetle family Brentidae. There are more than 30 described species in Paratrachelizus.

Species
These 35 species belong to the genus Paratrachelizus:

 Paratrachelizus adustus (Boheman, 1840)
 Paratrachelizus advena (Sharp, 1895)
 Paratrachelizus afflictus Kleine, 1922
 Paratrachelizus agnatus Kleine, 1922
 Paratrachelizus arduus (Sharp, 1895)
 Paratrachelizus aureopilosus (Senna, 1890)
 Paratrachelizus clavicornis (Boheman, 1840)
 Paratrachelizus cognatus (Sharp, 1895)
 Paratrachelizus dispar (Sharp, 1895)
 Paratrachelizus dorsalis (Boheman, 1840)
 Paratrachelizus ducalis (Sharp, 1895)
 Paratrachelizus elevatus (Sharp, 1895)
 Paratrachelizus ferrugineus (Lund, 1800)
 Paratrachelizus filiformis (Sharp, 1895)
 Paratrachelizus fracticornis (Sharp, 1895)
 Paratrachelizus frontalis (Sharp, 1895)
 Paratrachelizus geminatus (Sharp, 1895)
 Paratrachelizus laticollis (Sharp, 1895)
 Paratrachelizus linearis (Suffrian, 1870)
 Paratrachelizus lineatus (Sharp, 1895)
 Paratrachelizus nigricornis (Sharp, 1895)
 Paratrachelizus occlusus (Sharp, 1895)
 Paratrachelizus optatus (Sharp, 1895)
 Paratrachelizus prolixus (Sharp, 1895)
 Paratrachelizus punctatus Soares & Meyer, 1959
 Paratrachelizus robustus (Sharp, 1895)
 Paratrachelizus seriatus (Sharp, 1895)
 Paratrachelizus serratus (Sharp, 1895)
 Paratrachelizus simplex (Suffrian, 1870)
 Paratrachelizus sternalis (Sharp, 1895)
 Paratrachelizus sulcirostris (Boheman, 1833)
 Paratrachelizus tenuis (Suffrian, 1870)
 Paratrachelizus turgidirostris (Boheman, 1840)
 Paratrachelizus uncimanus (Boheman, 1839)
 Paratrachelizus ventralis Haedo Rossi, 1954

References

Further reading

 
 
 

Brentidae
Articles created by Qbugbot